Gundisalvus of Amarante, OP (1187 - 10 January 1259) was a Portuguese Catholic priest and a professed member from the Order of Preachers. He became a Dominican friar and hermit after his return from a long pilgrimage that took him to both Rome and to Jerusalem. He became noted as a wonderworker who made miracles occur and he was known for his solitude and silence in reflection in order to better achieve communication with God.

His beatification received approval in late 1561 under Pope Pius IV.

Life
Gundisalvus was born in 1187 in Portugal to nobles. It was said at his baptism he fixed his intense gaze upon the Crucifix as he was being carried to the baptismal font.

He was devoted to Jesus Christ in his childhood and decided to become a priest. He later received his ordination from the Archbishop of Braga after the successful completion of his studies and distributed his great wealth to his nephews. The new priest spent time in his parish of Saint Paio de Vizela and obtained leave so as to go to visit Rome and Jerusalem while leaving his priest nephew in charge of his parish. It was held that he returned from the pilgrimage after just over a decade. He visited the tombs of Saint Peter and Saint Paul before going to Jerusalem via ship.

Gundisalvus returned to find that austere measures he now upheld in his life were something that his nephew did not welcome and who set a dog upon him while viewing him as nothing more than a vagrant. Discernment led Gundisalvus to the Order of Preachers to which he was admitted into and he was allowed to live as a hermit who was in the service of his local people. He built a bridge himself over the Tâmega River. The workers who helped build the bridge once ran out of wine leading him to smack a rock with his stick causing it to split open with wine pouring out of it. On another occasion the workers ran out of food and he went to the water and called out promoting fish to jump onto the river bank providing the workers with food.

He died in 1259.

Cakes

The so-called "Bolos de São Gonçalo" (associated as promoting fertileness and fruitfulness) are associated with Amarante. The reason for the association with the name of Gonçalo is disputed and obscure.

Beatification
Pope Pius IV beatified him on 16 September 1561. But Pope Julius III had before on 24 April 1551 allowed for public worship in his name in Portugal though did not allow his beatification at that time. Pope Clement X - after the beatification - extended his public worship with a Mass and Divine Office to Portugal and the entire Dominican order.

The late priest is considered to be quite popular in Brazil and has several localities named after him such as São Gonçalo de Amarante and São Gonçalo.

References

External links
 Saints SQPN

1187 births
1259 deaths
12th-century Portuguese people
12th-century Roman Catholic priests
12th-century venerated Christians
13th-century Portuguese people
13th-century Roman Catholic priests
13th-century venerated Christians
Portuguese beatified people
Dominican beatified people
Hermits
People from Vizela
Portuguese Dominicans
Portuguese Roman Catholic saints
Venerated Catholics
Venerated Dominicans